Tatjana Veržbickaja (born 15 February 1993) formerly  Lithuanian footballer who plays as a midfielder for A Lyga club ŠSG-FA Šiauliai. She has been a member of the Lithuania women's national team. Also played for FC Gintra in UEFA women’s champion league.

International career
Veržbickaja capped for Lithuania at senior level during the Baltic Cup 2015, in a 3–0 win against Latvia on 29 August 2015.

References

1993 births
Living people
Women's association football midfielders
Lithuanian women's footballers
Lithuania women's international footballers
Gintra Universitetas players
Lithuanian women's futsal players